Gerald is a 2010 American comedy-drama film written, produced and edited by Tim Gallagher, directed by Marc Clebanoff (director of Break), and stars Louis Mandylor and Mackenzie Firgens with Deborah Theaker and Mickey Rooney. The main character, Gerald, was inspired by Forrest Gump, Seymour Krelborn of Little Shop of Horrors and Mr. Gallagher's personal experience with mentally challenged individuals.

Gerald was filmed around Los Angeles, CA in 2008.  The film premiered at the Chinese American Film Festival and has screened at the Down Beach Film Festival, Castle Rock Film Festival, the Sacramento Film Festival and Indie Spirit Film Festival, winning several awards including best actor for Louis Mandylor.

The role of Gerald, a mentally challenged individual, was a departure from Louis Mandylor's earlier tough guys roles, but it is also an endearing addition to his indie film roles, such as Nick Portokalos in My Big Fat Greek Wedding.

Plot
Gerald Andrews was dropped on his head at birth. 30 years later, the man-child Gerald works at the local bowling alley and lives with his mother in a mobile home park. When his mother suddenly dies, he finds himself still needing her close, and has her ashes placed inside her favorite ceramic doll, which he carries with him everywhere. With the help of his mother's eclectic friends, Gerald is coping, until the day the valuable doll is stolen. Gerald desperately searches for his mother's ashes. When Gerald finally finds the thief, he enlists the help of his friend, Helen, to steal the doll back. During the heist, things go awry when Helen is taken hostage. Gerald must decide between his mother's ashes or Helen's life.

Cast 
 Louis Mandylor as Gerald
 Mackenzie Firgens as Helen
 Luca Palanca as Lemtat's son
 Beau Puckett as Dolly
 Tara Karsian as Ethel
 Wylie Small as Kate
 Deborah Theaker as Mother
 Mickey Rooney as the Doctor
 Mark Damon Espinoza as the Cop
 Tim Gallagher as the Lawyer

Accolades 
 Golden Angel Award - Chinese American Film Festival
 Best Actor for Louis Mandylor - Down Beach Film Festival
 Best Actor for Louis Mandylor - Sacramento International Film Festival
 Best Supporting Actress nomination for Deborah Theaker (Samantha Andrews a.k.a. Mother) - Down Beach Film Festival
 Best Supporting Actress nomination for Mackenzie Firgens (Helen) - Down Beach Film Festival
 Best Director for Marc Clebanoff - Down Beach Film Festival
 Best Screenplay for Tim Gallagher - Down Beach Film Festival
 Special Presentation - Castle Rock Film Festival

Distribution 
Besides film festival screenings, Gerald was screened in several theaters in Colorado. U.S. distribution is through Gerald, the Movie, LLC which has made Gerald available as DVD and digital downloads from. Australia territory was sold in 2010.

References

External links
 
 
 Colorado Springs Gazette w/ Todd's picks for the Indie Spirit Film Festival 2011

American comedy-drama films
2010 films
2010 comedy-drama films
2010s English-language films
2010s American films